Rhu is a closed railway station located in the village of Rhu, in Argyll and Bute, Scotland, on the east shore of Gare Loch. It is located towards the southern end of the West Highland Railway.

History 
This station opened as "Row" on 7 August 1894.

The station was laid out with two platforms linked by a footbridge, one on either side of a crossing loop. The use of side platforms here was slightly unusual, since the West Highland Railway was otherwise built with island platforms at stations, apart from at its northern end. There were sidings on the south side of the station.

On 24 February 1927, the spelling of the station's name was altered to "Rhu". The station was host to a LNER camping coach from 1935 to 1939. A camping coach was also positioned here by the Scottish Region from 1954 to 1956.

The station was initially closed to passengers in January 1956, but reopened in April 1960.  A second (and final) closure came on 15 June 1964, when the Craigendoran (Upper) to  local service fell victim to the Beeching Axe.

Much of the structures have been demolished, but part of one platform is still visible.

There have been proposals to reopen the station as part of an experiment to open ‘pop-up’ stations in Scotland.

See also
Faslane Platform railway station - A nearby temporary WWII station

References

Sources

Further reading 
 

Disused railway stations in Argyll and Bute
Railway stations in Great Britain opened in 1894
Railway stations in Great Britain closed in 1956
Railway stations in Great Britain opened in 1960
Railway stations in Great Britain closed in 1964
Beeching closures in Scotland
Former North British Railway stations
James Miller railway stations